Rudolf "Rudy" Tajcnár (April 17, 1948 – August 2, 2005) was a Slovak ice hockey player who played for the Czechoslovak national team. He won a bronze medal at the 1972 Winter Olympics.

Tajcnár played two games in the World Hockey Association with the Edmonton Oilers during the 1978–79 season.

References

External links

1948 births
2005 deaths
Czechoslovak ice hockey defencemen
Edmonton Oilers (WHA) players
HC Ambrì-Piotta players
HC Košice players
HC Slovan Bratislava players
Ice hockey players at the 1972 Winter Olympics
Maine Mariners players
Medalists at the 1972 Winter Olympics
Olympic bronze medalists for Czechoslovakia
Olympic ice hockey players of Czechoslovakia
Olympic medalists in ice hockey
Slovak ice hockey defencemen
Ice hockey people from Bratislava
Czechoslovak expatriate sportspeople in Switzerland
Czechoslovak expatriate ice hockey people
Czechoslovak expatriate sportspeople in Canada
Expatriate ice hockey players in Switzerland
Expatriate ice hockey players in Canada
Czechoslovak expatriate sportspeople in the United States
Expatriate ice hockey players in the United States